The 2022–23 Liiga season is the 48th season of the Liiga (formerly SM-liiga), the top level of ice hockey in Finland, since the league's formation in 1975.

Teams

Regular season

Top six advanced straight to the quarter-finals, while teams between 7th and 10th positions played a wild card round for the final two spots. The Liiga is a closed series and thus there is no relegation.

Scoring leaders 
The following players led the league in regular season points.

Playoffs

Bracket

Wild-card round

Quarter-finals

Final rankings

See also 
 2022–23 Naisten Liiga season

References

Liiga seasons
Liiga
Liiga